The 2010 season is the 88th season of competitive football in Ecuador.

National leagues

Serie A

Champion: LDU Quito (10th title)
Runner-up: Emelec
International cup qualifiers:
2010 Copa Sudamericana: Emelec, Barcelona, Deportivo Quito
2011 Copa Libertadores: LDU Quito, Emelec, Deportivo Quito
2011 Copa Sudamericana: LDU Quito
Relegated: Universidad Católica, Macará

Serie B
Winner: LDU Loja (1st title)
Runner-up: Imbabura
Promoted: LDU Loja, Imbabura
Relegated: UT Equinoccial, Municipal Cañar

Segunda Categoria
Winner: Valle del Chota (1st title)
Runner-up: Deportivo Quevedo
Promoted: Valle del Chota, Deportivo Quevedo

Clubs in international competitions

National teams

Senior team
The senior team will play a number of friendlies in 2010 in preparation for the 2011 Copa América in Argentina.

Under-20 team
The under-20 team played two friendlies against Colombia in preparation for the 2011 South American Youth Championship.

Under-16 team
The under-16 team participated in the 2010 South American Games in Medellín. They finished the tournament in second place behind Colombia. Luis Batioja was the tournament's topscorer with eight goals.

References

External links
Official website  of the Ecuadorian Football Federation 
2010 league seasons on RSSSF

 
2010